EPC Groupe (Explosifs Produits Chimiques S.A.) is a French multinational company that trades in explosives and drilling; It is one of the world’s leaders in explosives manufacture, storage and distribution and in particular drilling and blasting.

History
It was founded in 1893 by Eugène-Jean Barbier and its first implantation was in Saint-Martin-de-Crau (France).

Structure
It is headquartered in La Défense (France). It has over fifty subsidiary companies around the world.

United Kingdom
In the UK it has two sites, in Somercotes, Derbyshire and Great Oakley, Essex, known as EPC-UK. It began in the UK in 1905. The UK head office is south of the A38, at the B600 junction. It started in the UK as Explosives and Chemical Products (ECP), later part of Exchem. It has a 12,000 acre test site on the Essex coast at Hamford Water in Tendring. Exchem had a subsidiary in Essex, Thames Nitrogen, that made explosives.

Products
It produces around 145,000 tonnes of explosive annually.

References

External links
 EPC Groupe
 EPC Groupe UK

1893 establishments in France
Chemical companies of France
Companies based in Derbyshire
Demolition
Explosives manufacturers
Manufacturing companies based in Paris
Manufacturing companies established in 1893
Mining companies of France
Mining engineering companies